Jessica Georganne Pilnäs, (born 5 July 1978 in Åryd, Växjö ), is a Swedish singer perhaps mostly known for her song "Jag ger dig allt". She sang the song in Melodifestivalen 1995, and came in third place. In 2000, Her song, "Pretender", which she recorded under the name Isa, also became a hit single in Sweden.

Born in Åryd, she is the daughter of Thommy Gustafsson, keyboard player for the Swedish band Sven-Ingvars. She married the guitarist Johan Norberg and by that  taking his family name and known as Jessica Norberg although continuing to use her original name Jessica Pilnäs in various recordings and appearances at concerts.

Discography

Albums
2011: Bitter and Sweet
2012: Norma Deloris Egstrom - A Tribute to Peggy Lee

Singles
1995: "Jag ger dig allt"
2000: "Pretender"  (under the name Isa)

References

External links
Melodifestivalen Entry

Swedish soul singers
20th-century Swedish women singers
21st-century Swedish women singers
1978 births
Living people
Melodifestivalen contestants of 1995